We're Not Robots... is the fourth and final studio album by Dallas hard rock band Edgewater. It was their first and only release since parting ways with Wind-up Records. The album was completely produced independently but is of equal or even better quality than many major label releases.  In many ways, We're Not Robots... is a shot at Wind-up. The album is considered to be much heavier and more emotionally complex than previous releases, and the songs deal with feelings of anger, desperation, hope, and betrayal.

Track listing
All tracks written by Matt Moseman, Micah Creel, Justin Middleton, Ricky Wolking and Jeremy "Worm" Rees. 
"Get it Right"  – 3:12
"Caught in the Moment"  – 2:52
"I Can't Breathe"  – 3:41
"Rock is Dead"  – 4:02
"S.O.S."  – 3:42
"Apples & Oranges  – 3:30
"Engage"  – 4:19
"U"  – 3:33
"S.O.B."  – 2:40
"Digging for Sounds"  – 4:29

Personnel
Ricky Wolking - Bass
Jeremy "Worm" Rees - Drums
Matt Moseman - Vocals
Justin Middleton - Guitar
Micah Creel - Guitar

External links
Official Site

Edgewater (band) albums
2006 albums